1953: An Exceptional Encounter is a live album by Ben Webster and the Modern Jazz Quartet that was recorded in 1953 and released in 2001.

Track listing 

Source:

Personnel 
 Ben Webster – tenor sax
 John Lewis – piano
 Milt Jackson – vibes
 Percy Heath – double bass
 Kenny Clarke – drums

Source:

References

2001 live albums
Ben Webster live albums
Modern Jazz Quartet live albums
Collaborative albums
Live instrumental albums